

Origin 
The South Leinster Senior Club Championship is a club championship for four teams who have won the Senior League from Kildare, Laois, Wexford and Wicklow. The GAA founded the championship in 1990. It is held in the first week of June and finished on the third week. The final is held at Dr Cullen Park, Carlow.

Winners 
 1990 - Portlaoise ( Portlaoise 1-15 to Naas's 2-10 )
 1991 - Baltinglass ( Baltinglass 0-17 to Clane's 1-13 )
 1992 - Baltinglass ( Baltinglass 2-14 to Ballyroan's 0-16 )
 1993 - Sarsfields ( Sarsfields 3-10 to Kilanerin–Ballyfad's 0-17 )
 1994 - Duffry Rovers ( Duffy Rovers 0-16 to Baltinglass's 1-11 )
 1995 - Portarlington ( Portarlington 0-14 to Clane's 0-13 )
 1996 - Round Towers ( Round Towers 3-18 to Rathnew's 1-15 )
 1997 - Clane ( Clane 1-17 to Kilanerin–Ballyfad's 0-15 )
 1998 - Rathnew ( Rathnew 3-15 to Stradbally's 0-10 )
 1999 - Kilanerin–Ballyfad (Kilanerin–Ballyfad 0-12 to Sarsfields's 1-08 )
 2000 - St Joseph's  ( St Joseph's 1-14 to Moorefield's 0-14 )

Leinster GAA club football competitions